Kentaro Iida (born 4 May 1998) is a Japanese judoka.

He is the gold medallist of the 2017 Judo Grand Slam Paris in the -100 kg category.

References

External links
 

1998 births
Living people
Japanese male judoka
Judoka at the 2018 Asian Games
Asian Games gold medalists for Japan
Asian Games medalists in judo
Medalists at the 2018 Asian Games
21st-century Japanese people